His Majesty's Penitentiary (HMP) refers to Newfoundland and Labrador's (NL) prison system in Canada. Its name is derived from the English prison system known as His Majesty's Prison Service (HMPS). The Newfoundland and Labrador prison system consists of five provincial prisons and two short-term holding facilities which include:  

 His Majesty's Penitentiary, (St. John's)
 The Clarenville Correctional Centre for women, (Clarenville)
 The Bishop's Falls Correctional Centre, (Bishop's Falls)
 The West Coast Correctional Centre, (Stephenville)
 The Labrador Correctional Centre, (Goose Bay)
 The St. John's City Lock-up, (St. John's)
 The Corner Brook Detention Centre, (Corner Brook)

Rank and structure 
NL's prison service is overseen by the superintendent of prisons, who is responsible for the management of all provincial prisons and short-term holding facilities. Each institution operates under a uniformed rank structure. 

HMP St. John's, is the largest prison in the province of NL, by size and inmate population. Originally constructed in 1859, it houses primarily male offenders and has a capacity of 175 inmates. It is believed to be the oldest prison currently operating in Canada since the closure of Ontario's Kingston Penitentiary, in September 2013. Located in the Eastern district of St. John's, it is commonly referred to by locals as, His Majesty's Hotel, or The Inn by the Lake, due to its proximity to Quidi Vidi Lake, which hosts North America's oldest annual sporting event, the Royal St. John's Regatta.

Despite its age, HMP St. John's, has undergone extensive renovations and additions, that provide inmates with modern cells, common areas and amenities. The province of NL, is responsible for the operation and administration of NL's correctional service under the Department of Justice and Public Safety.

Notable escapes 
 On December 12, 1964, four inmates escaped from HMP St. John's, by scaling a wall. The four prisoners stole a car and made their way to Whitbourne, NL, where they encountered RCMP Constable Robert Westen Amey. The 24 year-old mountie, attempted to arrest one of the four escapees, Melvin Young, who shot and killed Amey. Cst. Amey, was the second RCMP officer to be killed in the line of duty in the province of NL.
 On August 3, 2000, Richard Ryan became the subject of a Canada wide man-hunt after escaping from a NL correctional officer, who was escorting Ryan to visit his sick mother. Described by police as a sexual sadist, Ryan eluded capture for 25 days, before being located in a makeshift camp in a wooded area near Long Harbour, NL.

Notable inmates 
 Father James Hickey, a former Roman Catholic priest, who was convicted of multiple sex crimes against children in NL. Hickey was the first of numerous Roman Catholic priests and brothers, who were convicted of sex crimes in relation to a sex abuse scandal that rocked NL, and gained international infamy. While briefly held in HMP custody, Hickey would go on to serve the remainder of his sentence in Dorchester Penitentiary, New Brunswick, were he died in 1992. Michael Harris, a well-known journalist and former editor of NL's now defunct Sunday Express, which was largely credited for breaking the scandal, would go on the publish a best selling book regarding the Mount Cashel sex abuse scandal.
Paul Watson is an internationally known conservationist and founder of the Sea Shephard Conservation Society. In 1980, Watson was sentenced to ten days in prison for assaulting a fisheries officer, while attempting to disrupt the NL seal hunt. Watson served his sentence at HMP St. John's.
Vito Rizzuto, also known as Teflon Don, was a Mafia boss, and head of the notorious Rizzuto crime family, based in Montreal, Quebec. in UB1987, Rizzuto was arrested following a drug bust in Trinity Bay, NL, in an abandoned community called Ireland's Eye, where 225 million dollars of hashish was seized by RCMP. Rizzuto was remanded into HMP St. John's, before being released after a supreme court judge ruled that the RCMP had overstepped its surveillance efforts by wiretapping a meeting between Rizzuto and his attorney.
Brian O'Dea is a former international drug smuggler who gained notoriety when he placed an advertisement in Canada's National Post seeking a job. The advertisement was titled "Former Marijuana Smuggler" and read: "Having successfully completed a 10-year sentence, incident free, for importing seventy-five tons of marijuana into the United States, I am now seeking a legal and legitimate means to support myself and my family. Business experience: Owned and operated a successful fishing business -- multi-vessel, one airplane, one island and processing facility. Simultaneously owned and operated a fleet of tractor-trailer trucks conducting business in the western United States. ... I also participated in the executive level management of 120 people worldwide in a successful pot-smuggling venture with revenues in excess of $100-million US annually." O'Dea, served prison time in California, Springhill Institution, NS, and HMP St. John's.
Leo Puddester, was a former HMP correctional officer and union leader when he was sentenced to four months in prison for defying a court order in relation to a HMP wildcat strike he led in 1999. Puddister served his sentence at HMP St. John's, under the guard of the correctional officers he represented in labor relations with the NL government. Puddester would go on to lead the province's largest public sector union, the Newfoundland and Labrador Association of Public and Private Employees (NAPE). In 2004, Puddester led the province's then twenty-thousand public sector workers on strike, leading to several public feuds with NL's then premier, Danny Williams.
 Shirley Turner, a former medical doctor who was accused of killing her former boyfriend Andrew Bagby, in Keystone State Park, Pennsylvania, US. After Bagby's body was discovered, Turner fled to her home province of NL, initiating a prolonged extradition process by US authorities. Turner, who was pregnant with Bagby's child, later gave birth to Zachary Bagby, which initiated a child custody battle between Turner and Andrew Bagby's parents, David and Kathleen Bagby. Released from HMP's prison system on appeal of her extradition hearing, Turner murdered Zachery and then took her own life. David and Kathleen Bagby, along with their supporters were highly critical of the NL court process that lead to Turner being released from prison, and her ability to maintain custody of Zachary. Their activism and fight for justice led to the passage of Bill C-464, also known as Zachary's Bill, strengthening the conditions for bail in Canadian courts in cases involving the well-being of children. In 2008, Kurt Kuenne, a documentary filmmaker, and childhood friend of the Bagby family produced an award winning film based on the murders of Andrew and Zachary, called Dear Zachary: A Letter to a Son About His Father. David Bagby would go on to author a book detailing the events, and his family's struggles with the NL justice system.
Leo Crockwell, was a 55 year-old NL man when charged with five counts of attempted murder by NL mounties, after holding RCMP at bay for more than a week in a well-publicized police stand-off at a Bay Bulls home in 2010. Crockwell was able to escape the home, undetected, despite heavily armed mounties covering the perimeter of the house. Crockwell was arrested by the Royal Newfoundland Constabulary after hitching a ride to St. John's, where he told the driver of the vehicle he was travelling in, who he was. The incident was highly publicized and was a major embarrassment for the national police force. The Crockwell stand-off cost the RCMP just under half a million dollars, and its failure was the subject of an internal RCMP investigation, a book that outlined the events and the event itself remains public fodder in local lore. Crockwell was ultimately sentenced to four years in prison, which was served at HMP, St. John's.
Nelson Hart, was charged with two counts of first degree murder in June 2005, for the drowning deaths of his twin daughters in 2004, and was convicted in March 2007. In September 2014, an appeal court granted Hart a new trial. In July of that same year, the Supreme Court of Canada ruled that evidence obtained against Hart in a RCMP led "Mr. Big", operation was inadmissible. After the ruling, NL prosecutors declined to seek a retrial, and Hart was released from prison after serving nine years. The Supreme Court ruling led to stricter and more defined rules in the use of Mr. Big sting operations. Hart served his sentence partly in HMP's prison system. In 2015, NL journalist Colleen Lewis published a book in relation to the ordeal.
 Sean Buckingham, was a medical doctor with a well-established practice in downtown St. John's, NL. In May 2005, Buckingham was arrested for a variety of criminal offences, in relation to providing prescription drugs, primarily Oxycontin, to drug addicted patients in exchange for services such as sex. In 2008, Buckingham was sentenced to seven years in prison, serving his sentence at HMP.
 Ed Byrne is a former politician and member of the House of Assembly for NL. Byrne, who once led the provincial Progressive Conservative Party of NL, was sentenced to a two-year prison sentence for fraud related crimes in connection with a constituency spending scandal. Byrne served his prison sentence in HMP's prison system.
 Wally Andersen is a former politician and member of the House of Assembly for NL. A member of the NL Liberal Party, Anderson was sentenced to 15 months in prison for forgery and breach of trust, in relation to the constituency spending scandal. Anderson served his sentence in HMP's prison system, and later returned to politics, winning the mayor's seat of Happy Valley-Goose Bay, NL, in 2018.
 Randy Collins is a former politician and member of the House of Assembly for NL. Collins, who was a member of the NDP party of NL, was sentenced to 21 months in prison for fraud related charges in relation to the constituency spending scandal. Collins served his prison sentence in HMP's prison system. 
 Jim Walsh is a former politician and member of the House of Assembly for NL. Walsh, who was a member of the NL Liberal Party was sentenced to 22 months in prison for fraud and breach of trust, in relation to the constituency spending scandal. Walsh served his sentence in HMP's prison system. 
 Brandon Phillips was a 27 year-old NL man in October 2015, when he entered a St. John's hotel, and shot and killed Larry Wellman, a former firefighter in a botched robbery, which set the NL capital city on edge as police hunted for a killer. Phillips was arrested eight days after the shooting following the release of a photograph of Phillips taken from the hotel's security camera, which showed him entering the hotel with his face covered and a shotgun in hand. The arrest of Phillips would become a political hot potato for NL's Liberal party leader Dwight Ball, who was, at the time of the Wellman murder, poised to become NL's next premier. As the Wellman murder made its way through the court system, details of the case emerged, which included Phillips wearing Ball's coat when he committed the murder. Phillips had been in a romantic relationship with Ball's daughter, and was identified in the widely circulated suspect photograph, in part, due to Ball informing the Royal Newfoundland Constabulary that the murder suspect had been wearing a coat that was similar to one that had gone missing from his home. Court documents would later reveal that Phillips owed a large drug debt, and a St. John's drug dealer had been harassing the politician for payment. It was revealed that Ball had paid thousands of dollars to appease debts incurred by Phillips in an effort to keep his daughter safe. An emotional NL Premier detailed the ordeal to the CBC in December 2017. Brandon Phillips was sentenced to life in prison for the second-degree murder of Mr. Wellman, and served a portion of his sentence at HMP St. John's, before being transferred to a federal prison. 
Constable Douglas Snelgrove is a police officer and current member of the Royal Newfoundland Constabulary, who was convicted of sexual assault in 2021. In 2015, Snelgrove was arrested after driving a female home while on duty, using a marked police vehicle. Snelgrove sexually assaulted the female in her residence, and after a prolonged court process that involved three trials; he was sentenced to four years in prison, serving a small portion of that sentence in HMP's prison system, before being released pending an appeal.
Gregory Parsons (wrongfully convicted) is a NL born firefighter, currently serving as a lieutenant in the St. John's Regional Fire Department. At just 19 years of age, Parsons' mother Catherine Carroll was murdered in St. John's, by his long-time friend Brian Doyle. Days after the murder, Parsons was arrested and charged with second-degree murder by the Royal Newfoundland Constabulary. In 1994, Parsons was wrongfully convicted in relation to his mother's murder and sentenced to 15 years in prison. He served a portion of that sentence at HMP St. John's, before being released on appeal, and a new trial was ordered, however, Parsons was exonerated based on DNA evidence, before a new trial could commence; and his mother's real killer, Brian Doyle was arrested and charged with her murder. Doyle plead guilty to the Murder of Catherine Carroll, and was sentenced to 18 years in prison. The wrongful conviction of Parsons led to the Lamer inquiry, and the RNC police officer, who led the original investigation into Carroll's murder, and the subsequent prosecution of Parsons was later promoted to the deputy chief of the Royal Newfoundland Constabulary, leading to harsh criticism from Parsons and his supporters. Parsons continues to advocate for the wrongfully convicted, and other justice reforms. Parsons received the St. John's firefighter of the year award in 2021, and is a well-known figure in the province of NL for his ordeal.

Executions: His Majesty's Penitentiary, NL 
 July 1, 1892, Patrick Geehan
 July 8, 1889, William Parnell
 July 29, 1899, Francis Canning
 December 16, 1922, Wo Fen Gen
 May 22, 1942, Herbert Augustus Spratt

Notable events and controversies: circa 2000-present 

 In August 2000, the NL Justice Department announced disciplinary measures on both managers and correctional officers at HMP, after the fallout from the Richard Ryan escape. The department initiated an internal investigation of the high-profile escape, and determined that complacency and a repeated failure to follow well-established policy and procedures contributed significantly in Ryan's ability to escape lawful custody. Fourteen correctional staff received varying degrees of discipline, and the escape led to the resignation of the Assistant Superintendent of HMP St. John's. Newfoundland Labrador's Justice Minister would go on to appoint John Scoville, the province's chief probation officer to helm HMP's prison system.
 In March 2004, the government of NL announced the closing of the Salmonier Correctional Institute, a minimum security prison farm, located on the outskirts of St. John's.
 On June 13, 2003, August Zarpa, an Inuk inmate at HMP's Labrador Correctional Centre, committed suicide leading to a judicial inquiry. Zarpa was confined to his cell for four days following a disciplinary matter, and died of asphyxia from hanging. His death led to policy changes in the institution where an inmate could not be confined to their cell for anymore than 24 hours pending a disciplinary hearing, and the addition of having a psychiatrist visit the prison on a monthly basis.
In 2006, Carol Ikkusek, a 26 year old Inuk woman was brought into police custody in Happy Valley-Goose Bay. Ikkusek, who was originally being brought to hospital, was placed in RCMP cells, due to the hospital not having a secure room to treat her. Before being placed in a holding cell, Ikkusek was stripped naked, and left for two days. The incident sparked public outcry, and an apology from police in Labrador. Although, not in HMP custody, the incident was cited by NL's Justice Minister, Jerome Kennedy as one of the reasons for prompting a review of the province's prison system in 2008.
 In February 2008, hours before his trial was set to begin, Brian Fagan died in HMP custody, and his death was ruled a suicide. NL's Justice Minister, Jerome Kennedy told reporters in the days following the death, that there was no indication that Fagan was in a worried state of mind or agitated state of mind. St. John's Lawyer, Peter Ralph, said HMP is no place for anyone who is mentally ill, at the time of Fagan's death.
 In March 2008, Austin Alyward died at HMP, St. John's. Foul play was ruled out, however a cause of death could not be immediately determined. Alyward's family said he suffered from Bi-Polar disorder and depression and should not have been housed at HMP, but rather a hospital. In 2009, a retired NL justice was called upon to probe Alyward's death. The subsequent report was never made public, however, Austin Alyward Sr., the father of the deceased called the report into his son's death a "sham",
 On March 25, 2008, Christopher Mahon, who was in HMP custody at the St. John's City Lock-up appeared in court visibly bruised and beaten. "The police and the correctional officers did this to me", Mahon told news reporters outside the courtroom. Following his court appearance, two HMP correctional officers were suspended and later charged with assault. HMP officer Mike Hanlon was acquitted of the charge(s), while HMP officer Wayne Carrigan was convicted and sentenced to 14 days in jail.
On April 18, 2008, NL's Justice Minister, Jerome Kennedy, ordered an independent review of NL's Prison system after touring HMP St. John's and describing the living conditions in the prison as "appalling". Kennedy tasked two out of province prison officials with extensive expertise in prison management to conduct the review, and promised sweeping changes to the NL prison system.
 On October 1, 2008, the NL Justice Department removed John Scoville from his position as Superintendent of Prisons, following the release of the Decades of Darkness: Moving Towards the Light, prison report commissioned by Jerome Kennedy, earlier in the year, and promised more changes were coming.
 On October 2, 2008, the NL Justice Department removed Mary Alyward, as the Assistant Superintendent of HMP St. John's, following the release of the Decades of Darkness: Moving Towards the Light prison report, the day following the termination of Superintendent Scoville.
 On December 8, 2008,  a heavily redacted version of the Decades of Darkness: Moving Towards the Light, prison report was publicly released.
 On December 9, 2008, CBC News reported directly on several of the redacted segments of the report, noting that when the government posted the report online, "the redacted sections could be read by users with basic computer tools." The report was highly critical of HMP's prison system, noting deplorable, unsanitary and unsafe working conditions, security issues, poor management, poor staff morale, and a lack of basic services for inmates Including: little to no programming, and a virtually non-existent approach to overall inmate well-being. The report presented 77 recommendations to the NL government, all of which, the government and new Minister of Justice and Attorney General for NL, Tom Marshall said government were committed to implementing.
 In April 2009, Dane Spurrell, an 18-year-old man with autism was walking down a street in Mount Pearl, NL, when confronted by police. Mistaking Spurrell's autism for public intoxication, police handcuffed Spurrell, and brought him to the St. John's Lock-up placing him in HMP custody. Still under the guardianship of his mother; Diane Spurrell became frantic when her son did not return home from his walk. Ms. Spurrell called 911 to report her son missing only to learn that he had been detained at HMP's St. John's City Lock-up. The Spurrell's filed a complaint with the Royal Newfoundland Constabulary's Public Complaints Commission, and both the RNC and HMP were highly criticized regarding the incident, which led to an apology from both the Superintendent of Prison's, and the Chief of the Royal Newfoundland Constabulary.
In 2009, The Office of the Citizen's Representative (NL's ombudsmen) began an investigation into the prescribing methods of HMP prison psychiatrist David Craig, after receiving numerous complaints from inmates regarding Craig suspending their medications once incarcerated.
In February 2010, a HMP correctional officer was charged with drug trafficking and breach of trust, after he was caught attempting to smuggle drugs and various contraband into HMP St. John's, in a police sting, dubbed Operation Safeguard.
In September 2010, two violent inmates escaped from HMP's West Coast Correctional Centre, securing their way to freedom by kicking out a window secured with plywood. An embarrassed Justice Minister admitted to reporters that the Justice Department thought all windows in the prison were secured and reinforced, when they in fact had not been.
In December 2010, NL's Justice Minister stated he is not giving up on a campaign to persuade Ottawa to help replace HMP, St. John's.
In 2011, The Office of the Citizen's Representative concluded his review of Psychiatric services at HMP,  the Citizen's Representative recommended the termination of Craig's contract with the Department of Justice. The Department refused to alter the contract it had in place with Craig, and instead opted for a peer review of Craig's prescribing practices.
In November 2011, an inmate at HMP's West Coast Correctional Centre, escaped by scaling a fence during routine recreation. It was the third prison escape from the Stephenville prison, since the NL government had spent over $400,000 in security upgrades stemming from the Decades of Darkness prison report.
In 2012, the Citizen's Representative for NL, renewed his call for the removal of Craig, citing repeated complaints from the inmate population, including a St. John's woman who asked the court for a stiffer prison sentence, (federal prison sentence) so that she could avoid being a patient of Craig.
In November 2012, A peer review found that psychiatrist David Craig was meeting the standard of care in the psychiatric services he provides to inmates in N.L.
On February 20, 2013, an unidentified person targeted HMP St. John's, by throwing a Molotov cocktail towards the prison, sparking a brief fire and damaging several staff vehicles.
In August 2013, police were called to HMP, St. John's to help control what authorities described as a "small riot", at the prison. In March 2014, details of the riot began to emerge through court proceedings, and it was revealed that, during the riot inmates took control of a cell block and threatened to kill hostages and prison guards, threatening to cut their throat(s) or decapitate hostages should police intervene. After a tense stand-off, the inmates traded a fellow inmate that was being held hostage in exchange for two cigarettes, before police brought the matter under control.  Six inmates were charged in relation to the riot, which caused more than one hundred thousand dollars in damages to the prison. CBC News posted a video of the damages to their website on April 1, 2014.
 On October 7, 2013, NL's Justice Minister, Darrin King announced that the government of NL was replacing HMP St. John's with a new prison, and that the NL government was prepared to build a new facility without help from Ottawa.

 On February 9, 2014, police were called to HMP St. John's after a HMP inmate was attacked by several rival inmates in the prison's chapel, in what became known as the HMP Chapel Riot. Nine inmates faced criminal charges in relation to the riot, and in court proceedings attorney's representing two of the accused, claimed that three senior HMP managers and a HMP Sergeant were criminally negligent in not attempting to prevent the riot, when they had previous knowledge that a planned attack on the inmate was imminent. The NL government retained, former Justice Minister Jerome Kennedy to represent the prison officials, however, a NL judge shot down the attorney's claim stating that prison managers did not act in bad faith.  A group of correctional officers, made similar allegations against prison management turning to NL's Citizen's Representative to investigate their claim that prison management intentionally allowed the riot happen in order to relieve pressure that was mounting inside the prison. The Citizen's Representative investigated the claim and determined that the riot itself was preventable, but was unable to determine if the riot was an intentional act by prison management. The victim of the attack inside the prison's chapel would go on to receive a forty-five thousand dollar settlement from government of NL for failing to protect him.
On February 17, 2014, correctional officers at HMP St. John's, protested on the prison's parking lot in relation to safety concerns following the Chapel Riot incident. On that same day, NL's Justice Minister, Darren King, held a press conference with the Superintendent of Prisons, and announced that a contract for the design and location of a new prison would be awarded that week.
On July 14, 2014, NL's  latest Justice Minister, Terry French, said he's worried about escalating violence within HMP St. John's, and stated that building a new provincial prison was a "top priority" for government, adding that a new prison in NL is "long overdue".
In June 2014, inmates at HMP St. John's, rioted causing an additional hundred thousand dollars in damages, while destroying a prison living unit. It was the third riot in the span of a year at the St. John's prison. Twelve inmates faced criminal charges in relation to the incident.
On August 26, 2014, a correctional officer working at HMP's St. John's Lock-up reportedly struck a restrained man in custody, and was charged with assault. HMP officer Anthony Crocker was convicted of the assault and sentenced to community service. As a result of the guilty verdict, Crocker was fired from his job, but after appealing the verdict, an appeals court judge overturned his conviction and ordered a new trial, stating that the judge in his original trial "did not apply the correct law respecting the availability of the defence of self-defence." The crown would later withdraw the charge against Crocker, opting not to prosecute, citing a low degree of probability for a conviction.
On October 21, 2015, a HMP correctional officer went public in a CBC investigative report, warning of intense violence within the prison, coupled with aging infrastructure and poor prison management.
On November 13, 2015, correctional officers across NL, held protests at various HMP facilities demanding the resignation of the Superintendent of Prisons. Citing dangerous working conditions, three prison riots in a year long span, claims of harassment and bullying; and the implication by officers and lawyers that he was criminally negligent in relation to the Chapel Riot incident.
On November 16, 2015, NL's Justice Department publicly backed the Superintendent of Prison's, following province-wide prison protests, citing his extensive experience and commitment to ensuring the prison was as safe as possible.
On December 16, 2015, a HMP correctional officer publicly revealed that he had resigned from his position as a correctional officer due to suffering from Post Traumatic Stress Disorder, after six years of working in NL's prison system. The officer cited several reasons for his decision including a firebombing, in which his vehicle was damaged, multiple serious assaults, and poor prison management.
On March 1, 2016, NL's Justice Minister, Andrew Parsons, announced that a unit at HMP St. John's had undergone renovations to house female prisoners in response to overcrowding at HMP's Correctional Centre for Women in Clarenville, NL, sparking criticism from women's groups and justice advocates.
On January 17, 2017, NL's Justice Minister, Andrew Parsons, Jerry Earle the president of (NAPE), the union that represents NL correctional officers, and Bob Buckingham, a high profile St. John's attorney,  all expressed concerns regarding mounting violence at HMP, St. John's. Assaults at HMP had more than doubled in 2016, according to Justice Department statistics.
In June 2017, Beatrice Hunter, an Inuk grandmother, who was protesting in Labrador against the controversial Muskrat Falls project, was transferred from Labrador to HMP St. John's, after telling a Labrador judge she could not promise to stay away from the Muskrat Falls project site. Her arrest and transfer to HMP St. John's, brought harsh criticism, and sparked a rally outside the Colonial Building in St. John's and protests outside HMP,  which described Hunter as a "political prisoner".
On August 31, 2017, Douglas Neary, a 37 year-old father of two, and first time HMP inmate died by suicide at HMP St. John's. The lawyer representing Neary's estate filed a wrongful death suit against the NL government, vowing to expose the 'antiquated, inhumane and neo-medieval' management practices at HMP.
On October 3, 2017, police responded to HMP St. John's for a report of a bomb located somewhere on the penitentiary grounds.
On April 21, 2018, correctional officers at HMP's Clarenville Correctional Centre for women discovered a 27 year-old unresponsive woman in her cell, and began to administer first-aid. The woman was transferred to hospital where she later died. The family of the woman would go on to file a wrongful death suit against the NL government claiming that correctional officers failed in their duties to promptly administer life saving efforts. The lawsuit further named HMP psychiatrist David Craig, indicating that Craig's decision to take the woman off her medication, which was prescribed by another psychiatrist, was a contributing factor in her death.
On May 17, 2018, an inmate at HMP St. John's had his prison sentence reduced due to what a NL provincial court judge called "disturbing", evidence presented by HMP officials. The court heard that, Justin Jennings, a 34 year-old inmate was punished by HMP officials to the point that it severely affected his mental health. Jennings was segregated for an excessive amount of time, and denied basic rights. The court heard that Jennings' medication was cut off by prison psychiatrist David Craig, and that Craig had ignored a letter written to prison official's by a prison psychologist that Jennings was on the verge of a complete mental breakdown, recommending he be removed from segregation immediately. Craig reportedly disagreed with the psychologist, writing a letter to HMP's Assistant Superintendent, claiming that Jenning's was the author of his own misfortune writing, "HMP is, by its very nature, a punitive institution, not a therapeutic one."
In September 2017, the NL Human Rights Commission wrote to NL's Justice Minister calling for a review of the province's prison system in relation to the treatment of persons with mental health and intellectual disabilities. The commission asked that the province do an updated review of correctional facilities, with a focus on segregation and the treatment of inmates with mental health conditions or intellectual disabilities.The letter also noted a need for an increase in transparency and accountability surrounding the province's correctional facilities.
On September 21, 2017, HMP inmate Calvin Kenny went public, speaking with CBC news regarding mistreatment at HMP. Kenny, an inmate who served prison sentences in other federal correctional facilities in Canada, noted that the treatment inmates receive in NL facilities is harsher and inhumane compared to Canada's federal prison system.
On May 26, 2018, Samantha Piercey, a 28 year-old mother of two, was found deceased in her prison cell, following a reported suicide. Piercey's family would go on to file a wrongful death suit against the NL government, claiming that prison authorities, and HMP psychiatrist David Craig were negligent in their duties, causing Piercey to suffer physical, emotional and psychological damages.
On May 28, 2018, NL's Justice Minister, Andrew Parsons announced that the province had tasked Marlene Jesso, a retired Royal Newfoundland Constabulary officer to conduct a review of three recent deaths in HMP facilities.
On June 11, 2018, Geoff Peddle, the Bishop of the Anglican Diocese of Newfoundland and Labrador, wrote an open letter to justice officials expressing deep concern in relation to deaths at HMP facilities.
On June 15, 2018, Ches Crosbie, the Progressive Conservative leader of the opposition for NL, publicly called for in inquiry into the deaths at HMP.
On June 27, 2018, LIsa Piercey, the mother of Samantha Piercey, who died while in HMP custody, publicly called for an inquiry into the deaths at HMP.
On June 30, 2018, police were called to HMP St. John's, after a male inmate was found dead in his cell. Several days following the death, the parents of the deceased inmate, Christopher Sutton, spoke to CBC News regarding the shock and disbelief over the death of their son. CBC News asked the Justice Minister if there was a crisis at HMP, to which the minister responded, "No, I can't go that far yet." The minister went on to reject calls from Mr. Crosbie and Ms. Piercey for a public inquiry, stating that an internal review was underway, while passing on condolences to the family of Christopher Sutton.
On July 4, 2018, a letter surfaced from deceased inmate Chris Sutton, who wrote to the NL Human Rights Commission five days before taking his own life. In the letter, Sutton pleads for help, and likens the conditions he is experiencing at HMP to torture.
On July 6, 2018, Barry Fleming, the Citizen's Representative for NL, spoke publicly regarding the deaths in HMP custody, stating that a one person review of four inmate deaths does not go far enough. "This is not hysteria, this is a remarkable occurrence that needs a remarkable response", Fleming said. NL's Justice Minister, Andrew Parsons reiterated that government had no plans to commit to a public inquiry, stating: "we need to see what that change needs to be, and that comes out of doing a thorough investigation instead of making a knee-jerk reaction to a tragedy."
On July 11, 2018, HMP St. John's, inmates Chad Ralph and Justin Wiseman, who shared a cell block with Christopher Sutton went public with CBC News, stating that Sutton was ignored by correctional officers before his death, and claimed that guards laughed at Sutton when he spoke about taking his own life.
On July 11, 2018, Nape President Jerry Earle, of the union which represents NL's correctional staff said, the province's corrections staff are stressed by the recent suicides and challenging work environment.
On July 14, 2018, NL's daily newspaper, The Telegram, kicked off a two week series of special report investigative stories in relation to HMP, beginning with an article and accompanying photograph of HMP that described the prison as Hellish, Primitive and Midievil, in a play on words referring to the commonly used acronym HMP. The special report series included an editorial entitled: "Another Decade of Darkness", referring to the Decade of Darkness prison report commission by the NL government in 2008.   
On July 19, 2018, Canadian Senator Kim Pate, a vocal advocate for inmate rights visited NL in relation to deaths at HMP facilities. Pate stated, that mental health resources should be prioritized over building a new prison. Pate, who visited both HMP St. John's and HMP Clarenville, noted that an emphasis needed to be placed on rehabilitation. During her visit to HMP St. John's, the Canadian Senator witnessed first hand the nonchalant approach to prisoner needs. When Senator Pate arrived at the prison she noticed an inmate who had been released at 9:30am, sitting on a bench outside the prison. Five hours later, when the Senator was leaving, the inmate was still waiting on the bench. She approached the released inmate and learned that he was told that officers were supposed to call him a taxi to get home. Pate complained to the nearest guard that the man had been waiting for five hours for a ride home, prompting a correctional officer to call a taxi for the released inmate. "Building a new prison will not solve Newfoundland and Labrador's justice system problems", the Senator was quoted as saying.
On September 4, 2018, Austin Alyward, the father of Austin Alyward Jr, who died of a medical seizure while in HMP custody in 2008, warned the parents and family members of those whose deaths were being reviewed by Marlene Jesso, to not expect much from the new review, stating the review into his son's death a decade earlier produced nothing, but brownie points for the then governing tories.
On February 6, 2019, a heavily redacted copy of Marlene Jesso's Deaths in Custody report was made public. The report contained 17 recommendations to government, and advocates and media quickly noted that the recommendations contained in the report had been previously highlighted in other NL commissioned reports and reviews in relation to HMP. Some of the recommendations included replacing HMP St. John's with a new prison, and adapting a dynamic security prison model. Critics of NL's prison system were quick to point out the straight forward rational contained in the report, and questioned HMP's leadership. Mark Gruchy, a St. John's based lawyer and vocal critic of HMP said, some of the recommendations are "profoundly basic", such as developing a strategy to deal with drug trafficking inside the jail walls or having a policy on saving video surveillance of critical incidents. "These things to me should not be recommendations - they're common sense. It's mind-blowing to me that we have a corrections system and a justice system interconnected with it that requires an external report to once again recommend very, very basic issues."
On March 7, 2019, a NL man living in Toronto, ON, flew to NL, to begin a prison protest outside HMP St. John's. A self-described former inmate, who served time in several prisons across Canada, claimed he received help in federal institutions, but was tortured when doing time at HMP ten years previous. His protest gained local support as he live-streamed videos and made numerous uploads to Youtube. As his protest gained steam, he was joined by former correctional officers, former inmates, and community supporters. The former inmate's protest lasted a week, before he was arrested by the Royal Newfoundland Constabulary on a charge(s) of uttering threats to prison staff.
On November 6, 2019, police responded to HMP St. John's, after the death of 33 year-old Inuk inmate Jonathan Henoche. Henoche was killed after a reported confrontation with correctional officers, and justice officials originally attributed his death to a medical emergency. His death was later ruled a homicide by NL's Chief Medical Examiner. News of Henoche's death prompted renewed calls for a public inquiry, however, NL's Justice Minister shot down any notion of holding an inquiry into the death. The homicide, which was captured on HMP's CCTV camera system, was investigated by the Royal Newfoundland Constabulary, and on December 22, 2020, the RNC's major crimes unit announced it had charged ten of the province's correctional officers with varying criminal offences including manslaughter, criminal negligence causing death, and failing to provide the necessities of life. The announcement of the charges itself brought swift criticism from the legal community advocates, and an elected member of the House of Assembly due to the departments decision to not publicly name the ten accused. After mounting public pressure, NL's Justice Department named the correctional officers accused in connection with the Henoche homicide. The Canadian Broadcasting Corporation (CBC) noted that the circumstances surrounding the death had been noticeably vague, writing, "The Indigenous man was in protective custody when he was killed in November 2019. The status did not protect him from harm — which came not from inmates, but allegedly from correctional officers who now stand accused of ending 33-year-old Henoche's life. From the start, the circumstances of exactly how he died have been veiled, if not kept outright from the public eye." After a brief battle between the NL government and the union that represents NL correctional officers, an arbitrator ordered the government of NL to pay the legal fees of the ten accused. A preliminary hearing began in August 2021, which included a publication ban, that prevented media from reporting on the facts of the case. In December 2021, a NL judge dismissed all homicide related charges against the accused officers stating that throughout the video of the Henoche homicide correctional officers were "professional and dutiful" in their actions, calling the case against them, "most unfortunate", and stating that Henoche was far from a model inmate, committing numerous infractions while housed at HMP. Despite the judges decision, Henoche's lawyer filed a wrongful death suit against the province stating that he plans on interrogating the officers under oath.
In February 2020, RCMP were called to HMP's Labrador Correctional Centre, when inmate Jacob Collins was found dead in his cell.
On December 4, 2020, St. John's lawyer Bob Buckingham made national headlines when he filed a lawsuit against the provincial government on behalf of his client, Blair Harris, a former inmate at HMP's Bishop's Falls Correctional Centre. The lawsuit claimed that Harris had been escorted to a dentist's office in Gander, NL by two correctional officers, and while sedated, one of the correctional officers performed dental surgery on him, while the other recorded it on his cellphone. Harris learned that a correctional officer had performed a dental procedure on him from the Superintendent of Prison's after video of the incident had circulated throughout the prison. The two correctional officers were fired, and the RCMP charged former HMP officer's Ronald McDonald and Roy Goodyear with aggravated assault and assault with a weapon. Louis Bourget, a dentist who practices in both NL and NS, was also charged in the incident.
On February 26, 2021, police responded to HMP's St. John's City Lock-up for a report of a sudden death, which was later ruled a suicide.
On September 16, 2021, a HMP St. John's, inmate was found unresponsive in his cell and transported to hospital where he later died. Gregory Pike, a 30 year-old HMP inmate, and father of one died by suicide. Pike's sister, Courtney Pike, said she could barely contain her emotions when she read the Justice Department's statement in relation to her brother's death, "It was like they were sweeping it under the rug, because they know this is an ongoing issue in the system", she said. Pike's death prompted a prison protest outside HMP St. John's, were his family and supporters gathered to bring attention to the ongoing problems in NL's  prison system.
On October 21, 2021, a NL Supreme Court judge, certified a class-action lawsuit involving 70 inmates from HMP's prison system, who claim that the province of NL, has been aware of the significant mental health impact on inmates, due to prolonged periods or excessive use of solitary confinement, claiming that despite the province's awareness of the significant harm it creates, HMP's prison system continues to adopt punitive measures that lead to prolonged periods of solitary confinement for NL inmates.  
On November 24, 2021, the government of NL, issued a request for proposals for a new prison to replace HMP St. John's. The announcement set off another wave on controversy as a NL member of the House of Assembly, said other bidders pulled out of the tendering process because government was favoring a single bidder, over two other companies that had submitted proposals.
On January 27, 2022, St. John's based attorney Rosellen Sullivan, who represented Jordan Constantine, one of three correctional officer's charged with manslaughter in relation to the Henoche homicide, called for a public inquiry into the Henoche death to clear her clients name, and bring a sense of closure to Henoche's family. Sullivan stated that there is a public perception that Henoche was beaten to death and it's unfair to the officers that such a perception persists. Bob Buckingham, a vocal critic of HMP, and the attorney representing the Henoche family in a wrongful death suit against the province, also reiterated his call for a public inquiry into the death, asking if Johnathan Henoche would be alive - if not for the treatment he received at the hands of correctional officers on November 6, 2019.
On February 2, 2022, the assistant superintendent of HMP St. John's was removed from her position by the Department of Justice and Public Safety. Media outlets reported that correctional staff at the prison received an email informing them of her termination, and that she was forbidden from entering the prison. The NL Justice Department did not state a particular reason for the sudden termination, citing privacy concerns. 
On July 7, 2022,  the CBC reported that an inmate at HMP St. John's had his prison sentence reduced by six months due to the harsh conditions he endured while being housed at the facility. The inmate in question claimed he contracted Covid-19 during his stay at the prison, as well as being excessively confined, limited recreation, and limited access to programming and mental health services. The inmate further described living in a rat infested situation, combined with excessive mold and overall unsanitary conditions, such as a toilet that did not function properly. The inmate further complained of being ridiculed by both inmates and correctional officers due to a disability. Cindy Murphy, the executive director of the NL chapter of the John Howard Society, called for a overhaul of NL's penal system, stating that a complete overhaul is necessary to rid NL prison's system of a cultural problem that plagues the system in general. Murphy noted that building a new prison without addressing the need for cultural change will only import the same problems into a new building. 
On August 3, 2022, the CBC reported that the ten HMP St. John's correctional officer's previously accused in relation to the death of former inmate Johnathan Henoche had filed a civil lawsuit against the province of NL. In addition to the province, the lawsuit named the Royal Newfoundland Constabulary the province's Chief Medical Examiner and its Crown Prosecutor. The ten correctional officers claim that charges against them were wrongfully pursued causing them to suffer undue damage to their mental health, reputations and finances. 
During record heat (attributed to climate change) during the summer of 2022, in NL. Various HMP inmates and correctional officers complained of unbearable heat, and poor air quality at HMP St. John's; (conditions that had been previously highlighted in the 2008 Decades of Darkness Prison Report.) The record heat combined with correctional staff being forced to work 24 hour shifts, (a problem also noted in the 2008, Decades of Darkness Prison Report), led to severe shortages of staffing levels, leading to a lack of services and programming for the inmate population, prompting prison advocates to liken the prison to a "pressure cooker", situation. 
In September 2022, the family of Jacob Collins, an inmate who committed suicide at HMP's Labrador Correctional Centre in 2020, announced that they were suing the provincial government in relation to his death.
On December 6, 2022, NL's auditor general released a scathing report into deficiencies within HMP's policy and procedure's especially in regards to inmate rehabilitation and community monitoring of sentenced offenders. The auditor general noted that HMP is currently operating under antiquated procedure's and made several recommendations to NL's Justice Department including the implementation of  new legislation that has been stalled in the province's House of Assembly since 2011, which was drafted in relation to the Decades of Darkness prison Report, released in 2008.

References 

Prisons in Canada
1854 establishments in Newfoundland